Serafim Sergeyevich Tulikov (July 7, 1914 – January 29, 2004) was a Russian  and Soviet composer, who was born in the Imperial Russia, and died in Russia. He was often credited as S. Tulikov in his musical works and his cameo appearance in Russian television series. Serafim Tulikov is known for his patriotic and officially ideological compositions.

Early years
Serafim Tulikov was born in Kaluga, western Russia, to the family of bookkeeper Grigoriy Boboedov. Both parents of Serafim were active in choirs during their youth, and Serafim was deeply immersed in music during his childhood. He was eventually enrolled into the Kaluga Academy of Music, and at the age of 18, he studied at many conservatoires in Russia.

A promising composer
During the mid-1940s Serafim Tulikov composed a range of melodious lyrical-patriotic songs which became quite popular, for instance, "The Kursk Nightingale" ("Курский соловей"), with lyrics by Olga Fadeeva.  The majority of these songs celebrated the return of peaceful life to war-torn Russia.  Tulikov was also heavily influenced by the post-war trend in Soviet popular music towards increasingly archaic and folkloristic imagery and melodic formulas, for instance, in songs such as "They have come for a sojourn" ("Приезжали на побывку") (lyrics by Yakov Belinsky), "Moscow the Capital" ("Москва-столица"), and "Blossom, my Homeland!" ("Цвети, наш край")(lyrics by Sergei Vasiliev).

In 1951, Tulikov composed "March of the Soviet Youth" ("Марш советской молодежи") (lyrics by Yevgeniy Dolmatovsky) which received the First Prize at the 3rd World Festival of Youth and Students held in East Berlin. This march continued and developed the pattern established by the composer in "We Are for Peace!"; unbridled optimism, mass-mobilizing appeal, and sunny imagery. The initial version of the "March of the Soviet Youth" contained the following words: "Our youth carry love for their Great Leader in their hearts! Stalin is leading us into the future! The path he has chosen for us is the right one!" After Nikita Khrushchev's "de-Stalinization" campaign in 1956, these words were duly replaced.

Throughout most of the 1950s, Tulikov continued to compose for all sorts of official ideological occasions, including Communist Party of the Soviet Union congresses, youth festivals, and professional conventions. Tulikov's style of optimism found its expression in such songs as "This is Us, the Youth!" ("Это мы, молодежь")(lyrics by Lev Oshanin), written on the occasion of the 5th World Festival of Youth and Students held in Warsaw in 1955, "My Beloved Motherland" ("Родина любимая моя") (lyrics by Andrei Dostal), dedicated to the 40th Anniversary of the October Revolution in 1957.  With time, Tulikov's style of mass-marching songs had undergone some substantial changes. In the beginning his marches were dynamic and energetic, strongly influenced by the mass songs of Isaak Dunayevsky, but by the late 1950s, Tulikov's marches became more solemn, more static and more hymnal, as in "My Beloved Motherland".

In his more lyrical songs of his early career, Tulikov developed his style of heartfelt and quiet melodies. Such songs include "My Love, my Life" ("Жизнь моя, любовь моя") (lyrics by Anton Prishelets), "I Love You, my Sea" ("Я люблю тебя, море") (lyrics by Anatoly Salnikov), "Above the Moscow River" ("Над Москвою-рекой") (lyrics by Lev Kondyrev), and "Golden Altai" ("Алтай золотой") (lyrics by Tsezar Solodar).  The composer also made his contribution to a subgenre of the Soviet song, the army song.  He authored a song dedicated to the Soviet Pacific Fleet, "Above the Bleak Kuriles Range" ("Над серой Курильской грядою") (lyrics by Nikolai Bukin), a work which combined elements of heroic devotion to the Motherland with pensiveness and longing for the far-away family and its comforts.

In reflecting on the sources of inspiration for his songs, Serafim Tulikov later confessed that it came mostly from the reminiscences of his homeland, Kaluga, and most of the elements within the songs were present in Kaluga.  In the early 1960s, Tulikov would write a song dedicated to Kaluga, properly entitled "The Town of My Youth" ("Город юности моей") (lyrics by Mikhail Pliatskovsky), a sweet and unassuming yet sincere and heartfelt song.

During Khrushchev's Virgin Lands Campaign of bringing the vast steppes of Kazakhstan and South Siberia into agricultural use, Tulikov composed another well known song, "Komsomol Direction" ("Комсомольская путевка") (lyrics by Tsezar Solodar), which declared: "On the go! On the go! The Komsomol direction calls us! And the merry song at the threshold sees us off forward!"

Mature phase 

Many of the older generation of Soviet composers did not feel particularly comfortable after the onset of the television age in the 1960s.  Serafim Tulikov adjusted himself, and established himself as one of the leading and most popular Soviet songwriters.)  His repertoire, as well as the stylistic forms he used, expanded significantly.  On the one hand, Tulikov composed such near-hymnal solemn songs as "Lenin is Forever with You" (lyrics by Lev Oshanin), perhaps one of the most successful and widely known Soviet songs dedicated to Vladimir Lenin, and "Motherland" (lyrics by Yuri Polukhin).  On the other hand, he wrote songs which clearly carried in themselves an imprint of the cultural thaw of the 1960s, such as "Smile!" (lyrics by Mikhail Pliatskovsky), "Equation with One Unknown" (lyrics by Mikhail Pliatskovsky), and "This will Never Be Repeated" (lyrics by Mikhail Pliatskovsky) These contained no explicit elements of ideology or patriotism, and they were decidedly divorced from the folkloristic tradition in which the majority of Tulikov's lyrical songs of the 1940s-50s were rendered.

Tulikov continued to contribute mass songs dedicated to various important events in Soviet history and politics.  His song "To the Distant Planets!" (lyrics by Yuri Polukhin) was a work of optimism designed to celebrate the USSR's technological breakthroughs.  Unsurprisingly, it was written in the wake of Yuri Gagarin's first space journey in 1961. In 1964, Tulikov's only opera, Barankin, bud' chelovekom, premiered in Moscow.

In the late 1960s Tulikov began to compose songs with overtly neo-Slavophile overtones.  They were all dedicated to Russia, yet were different from his previous patriotic style.  They became explicitly more folkloristic and filled with rural and natural imagery, such as Russia's meadows, fields, sky, lakes and rivers.  The elements of wistfulness and even light sadness, as if bidding farewell to something destined to extinction, became more and more prominent. Examples of this period include  "There, Far Away is my Russia" (lyrics by Vladimir Kharitonov), "Love Confession" (lyrics by Mikhail Tanich), "Treasure Russia" (lyrics by Oleg Miliavsky), and "My Native Homeland" (lyrics by Peter Gradov).

Tulikov continued to write songs dedicated to the Soviet Army, its exploits and traditions, such as "Veterans' Souls Do Not Age" (lyrics by Yakov Belinsky), which became popular with the USSR leadership, itself composed of many who actively participated in the Great Patriotic War, and "The Son of Russia" (lyrics by Vladimir Kharitonov). Tulikov became notorious for composing multiple songs about Lenin and the Communist Party of the Soviet Union.  For instance, an incredibly pompous and anthem-like song "I Sing of My Motherland" (lyrics by Nikolai Dorizo) was dedicated to the opening of the 26th Party Congress in 1981.  The song praised the strength and the global mission of the Soviet state and pointed out that this strength was not based on fear and intimidation but rather on genuine achievements and generosity of the Soviet people.

In the early 1960s Tulikov wrote a very successful song about Moscow, "I sing of you, my Moscow" (lyrics by Yuri Polukhin).  The phrase "Moscow, your fame is flying on the wings of your glory all over the world!  Moscow, you are the heart of my Motherland!" became legendary. In the 1970s, Tulikov contributed several songs to the project of constructing the Baykal-Amur Mainline railway, launched by the Soviet government in 1974–75.  The "BAM Waltz" (lyrics by Mikhail Pliatskovsky) became perhaps the most famous of these songs.

Assessment 

As the Soviet Union unravelled in the late 1980s, Serafim Tulikov found himself increasingly isolated to deal with the change.    Tulikov's traditionalism, as well as his penchant for slow-flowing and sweet lyrical tunes, was sharply at odds with the newly fashionable avant-garde and radical rejection of harmony and tranquility in music, in favor of cacophony and wild rhythms.  Tulikov gradually faded away from public prominence.  He died in retirement in 2004.  Some of his musical legacy has been resurrected by the lovers of Soviet music.  However, the majority of what has been reissued and revived has been Tulikov's most non-political, light lyrical music of the 1960s-70s.

References

External links
Biography on the website Yandex. Dictionary 
  Honorary Citizens of Kaluga 
  Туликова А. С.  Жизнь, прожитая не зря. Личность и творчество композитора Серафима Туликова. - Москва: Издательский Дом Тончу, 2014. - 560с. , ил.    

1914 births
2004 deaths
People from Kaluga
People from Kaluzhsky Uyezd
Communist Party of the Soviet Union members
Russian male classical composers
Soviet composers
Soviet male composers
Russian opera composers
Male opera composers
Soviet classical pianists
20th-century classical pianists
Russian classical pianists
Male classical pianists
Soviet classical musicians
Russian classical musicians
Russian songwriters
Russian film score composers
Male film score composers
Socialist realism
20th-century Russian male musicians
Moscow Conservatory alumni
People's Artists of the USSR
People's Artists of the RSFSR
Stalin Prize winners
Recipients of the Order of Lenin
Recipients of the Order of the Red Banner of Labour
Burials at Vagankovo Cemetery